Alarm.com, Inc is an American technology company that provides cloud based services for remote control, home automation and monitoring services.

Monitoring services can include contracts through third-party contractors such as ADT. Services include interactive security, video monitoring, energy management and home automation, and are enabled through an ecosystem of integrated devices and hardware partnerships. 

Alarm.com's common stock is traded on Nasdaq under the ticker symbol ALRM.

History 
Alarm.com was founded in 2000 as part of MicroStrategy's research and development unit, and launched an interactive security program that enabled remote monitoring and arming for a disarmed security system in 2002. The company has since expanded its platform to offer integrated smart home and business software that include video monitoring, energy management and a range of home automation capabilities. In February 2009, Alarm.com was acquired by venture capital firm ABS Capital Partners for $27.7 million. In 2015, Alarm.com filed for an initial public offering and went public that June.

Alarm.com provides a cloud-based platform for smart home and business operating systems. Subscribers can secure and monitor their property through web-based and mobile applications, as well as through Apple TV, Amazon FireTV, Google Home and Amazon Alexa. The company began offering energy management in early 2010, allowing users to remotely control heating and cooling on their property using mobile apps or via the company's website.

Alarm.com reported revenues of $167.3 million and a user base of more than 2.3 million subscribers in 2014. In 2018, the company reported revenue of $291.1 million.

In 2015, Alarm.com issued an IPO at $14 a share. ABS Capital Partners and Technology Crossover Ventures, which invested $136 million in the company, remained the majority shareholders.

In 2016, Alarm.com integrated its cloud-based connected home platform with Amazon's Echo wireless speaker and voice-command devices as well as the HomeKit-compatible Apple TV.

In 2020, Alarm.com acquired Shooter Detection Systems for an undisclosed sum.

References 

2000 establishments in Virginia
Security companies of the United States
Home automation companies
American companies established in 2000
Technology companies established in 2000
Companies based in Vienna, Virginia
Companies listed on the Nasdaq
2015 initial public offerings